The ABCS Tournament is an annual football tournament between the representative teams of Aruba, Bonaire, Curaçao and Suriname.

Louis Giskus, the President of the Suriname Football Federation said that the competition was formed "to strengthen the relationship between the Dutch speaking countries in the Caribbean".

If the scores are level after 90 minutes plus injury time, the game proceeds straight to penalty kicks. No extra time is allocated.

Venues

Tournaments

Notes

Teams' achievements
{| class="wikitable sortable"
|-
!
!Team
!style="background:gold;"|Winners
!style="background:silver;"|Runners-up
!style="background:#c96;"|Third-place
!style="background:#9acdff;"|Fourth-place
|-
|1
| 
| style="background:gold;"|3 (2010, 2013, 2015)
|style="background:silver;|2 (2012, 2022)
|style="background:#c96;"|1 (2011)
| style="background:#e9e9e9;" |
|-
|2
| | style="background:gold;"|2 (2021, 2022)|style="background:silver;|2 (2010, 2013)
|style="background:#c96;"|2 (2012, 2015)
|style="background:#9acdff;"|1 (2011)
|-
|3
| | style="background:gold;"|1 (2012)|style="background:silver;|2 (2011, 2015)
|style="background:#c96;"|3 (2010, 2021, 2022)
|style="background:#9acdff;"|1 (2013)
|-
|4
| | style="background:gold;"|1 (2011)|style="background:silver;|1 (2021)
|style="background:#c96;"|1 (2013)
|style="background:#9acdff;"|4 (2010, 2012, 2015, 2022)
|-
|
|
| style="background:#e9e9e9;" | 
| style="background:#e9e9e9;" | 
| style="background:#e9e9e9;" | 
|style="background:#9acdff;"|1 (2021)'|-
|}

Medals by nations (2010–2021)
Update after 2022 ABCS Tournament (7th).

Tournament history
ABCS Tournament 2010
Also known as the Pais Positivo Cup 2010''.

First round

Third place playoff

1 Players of Bonaire walked off the pitch after a disagreement over a penalty kick being given against them.

Final

ABCS Tournament 2011

First round

Third place playoff

Final

ABCS Tournament 2012
The 2012 edition of the tournament is to be hosted in Aruba between 13 and 15 July.

First round

Third place playoff

Final

ABCS Tournament 2013
The 2013 edition of the tournament was hosted in Curaçao between 14 and 16 November.

First round

Third place playoff

Final

ABCS Tournament 2014
It was initially announced that the 2014 edition of the tournament would be hosted by Suriname from November 7–9. All matches were to be played at André Kamperveen Stadion. Following a strong performance by Curacao during 2014 Caribbean Cup qualification, the tournament was moved to 28–30 November since Curacao would be participating in the finals of the 2014 Caribbean Cup. It was later announced that the tournament had been postponed until 2015 because Curacao had just finished a long Caribbean Cup process.

ABCS Tournament 2015
The 2015 edition of the tournament was hosted in Suriname between 30 January and 1 February.

First round

Third place playoff

Final

2018 ABCS Cup
The 2018 edition of the tournament was scheduled to be played 11–13 May 2018 at the Trinidad Stadium in Oranjestad, Aruba but was cancelled after Curaçao withdrew and qualification for the 2019–20 CONCACAF Nations League was announced.

2021 ABCS Tournament
The ABCS tournament 2021 between Aruba, Bonaire, Curaçao and Curaçao B took place between October 1 and 3. Curaçao, whose football association got 100 years old in 2021, hosted.

First round

Third place playoff

Final

2022 ABCS Tournament
The 2022 ABCS Tournament is set to be hosted by Curaçao and will be the 7th edition.
The tournament is scheduled for 24–26 November 2022. This edition will feature all four countries of Aruba, Bonaire, Curaçao and Suriname since 2015.

First round

Third place playoff

Final

References

External links 

 Wildsat.com
  Caribbean football database
 Non FIFA football

International association football competitions in the Caribbean